Tylaphelenchus is a genus of nematodes belonging to the family Aphelenchidae.

Species:

Tylaphelenchus ipidicola
Tylaphelenchus leichenicola

References

Secernentea genera